The L-series is a compact inline-four engine created by Honda, introduced in 2001 with the Honda Fit. It has ,  and  displacement variants, which utilize the names L12A, L13A and L15A. Depending on the region, these engines are sold throughout the world in the 5-door Honda Brio Fit/Jazz hatchback Honda Civic and the 4-door Fit Aria/City sedan (also known as Fit Saloon). They can also be found in the Japanese-only Airwave wagon and Mobilio MPV.

Two different valvetrains are present on this engine series. The L12A, L13A and L15A use, or “intelligent Dual & Sequential Ignition”. i-DSI utilizes two spark plugs per cylinder which fire at different intervals during the combustion process to achieve a more complete burn of the gasoline. This process allows the engine to have more power while keeping fuel consumption low, thanks to the better gasoline utilization. Emissions are also reduced. The i-DSI engines have two to five valves per cylinder and a modest redline of only 6,000 rpm, but reach maximum torque at mid-range rpm, allowing for better performance without having to rev the engine at high speeds. The i-DSI is also known for not using Turbochargers in the performance category, as it uses a high compression, long stroke with a lightweight and compact engine.

The other valvetrain in use is the VTEC on one of the two varieties of the L15A. This engine is aimed more at performance than efficiency with a slightly higher redline with 4 valves per cylinder, which reaches peak torque at higher rpm. However, it still offers a good combination of both performance and fuel efficiency. Both the i-DSI and VTEC have relatively high compression ratios at 10.8:1 and 10.4:1, respectively.

Before April 2006, the L-series were exclusively available with a 5-speed manual transmission , continuously variable transmission (CVT) and dual clutch transmission (DCT). With the introduction of the Fit in Canada and the United States, an L-series engine was mated to a traditional automatic transmission with a torque converter for the first time. The L12A i-DSI is available exclusively in the European domestic market Jazz and is sold with only a 5-speed manual transmission.

As of 2010, the L15A7 (i-VTEC) is a class legal engine choice for SCCA sanctioned Formula F competition, joining the 1.6L Ford Kent engine.

In 2016 Honda introduced the L15B (DOHC-VTC-TURBO-VTEC) engine as part of their continuing global earth dreams strategy for lower emissions and higher fuel economy for a range of their cars, available with 6-speed manual and CVT transmissions with Earth Dreams Technology.

L12

L12A i-DSI

Available exclusively in the European domestic market Jazz and available with only a 5-speed manual transmission.
Displacement: 
Bore x Stroke: 
Compression Ratio: 10.8:1
Power:  at 5,700 rpm
Torque:  at 2,800 rpm
Variations: L12A1
SOHC 8 valves
8 spark plugs, 2 per cylinder
Application: 
Honda Jazz (Europe, 2002-2008)
Honda City (Pakistan, 2002-2008)

L12B1 i-VTEC
SOHC 16 valve VTEC
Displacement: 
Bore x Stroke: 
Compression Ratio: 10.2:1
Power:  at 6,200 rpm
Torque:  at 4,900 rpm
 emission: /km
RPMLock: 6,500 rpm
SpeedLock: 
ECU: Bosch, Keihin
Applications:
Honda Jazz (Europe, 2008–2013)

L12B3 i-VTEC

SOHC 16 valve VTEC
Displacement: 
Bore x Stroke: 
Compression Ratio: 10.2:1
Power:  at 6,000 rpm
Torque:  at 4,800 rpm
SpeedLock: 
Applications:
Honda Brio (Southeast Asia, 2011–present)
Honda Brio Amaze (Southeast Asia, 2013–2020)
Honda City (Pakistan, 2021–present)

L12B4 i-VTEC

SOHC 16 valve VTEC
Displacement: 
Bore x Stroke: 
Compression Ratio: 10.2:1
Power:  at 6,000 rpm
Torque:  at 4,800 rpm
Applications:
Honda Brio Amaze (India, 2018–present)

L13

L13A i-DSI

Sold as a 1.3 in the Japanese Fit/Fit Aria and only available with the advanced ZF-DCT CVT transmission with 7 Speeds developed in Germany. European Civic 1.4 i-DSI has a standard 6-speed manual with an available 6-speed automated manual I-SHIFT transmission.
For 7th gen Civic, City, Fit & Jazz Models
Displacement: 
Bore x Stroke: 
Compression Ratio: 10.8:1
Horsepower:  at 5700 rpm (Europe)
 at 5700 rpm (Japan)
Torque:  at 2800 rpm
Variations: L13A1 (Fit/Jazz), L13A7 (European market Civic), L13A8 (European market City)
For 8th gen Civic
Displacement: 
Bore x Stroke: 
Horsepower: 
Torque: 
CO2 emission: /km (for the Honda Civic Hybrid)

L13Z i-VTEC 
 Available in the second generation Honda Fit (Japan series GE6 / GE7), Honda Airwave in Japan, and the European Honda Civic.
 SOHC 16 valve i-VTEC
 Displacement: 
 Bore x Stroke: 
 Compression Ratio: 10.5:1
 Horsepower:  at 6,000 rpm
 Torque:  at 4,800 rpm
 source https://web.archive.org/web/20101210012605/http://www.honda.co.jp/Fit/webcatalog/spec/

L13B i-VTEC
DOHC 16 valve i-VTEC
Displacement: 
Bore x Stroke: 
Compression: 13.5:1
Power:  at 6,000 rpm
Torque:  at 5,000 rpm (GK3 Fit)
Top Speed: 
Honda Fit (Japan series GK3/4)

L13Z1 i-VTEC

SOHC 16 valve i-VTEC
Displacement: 
Bore x Stroke: 
Compression Ratio: 10.5:1
Power:  at 6,000 rpm
Torque:  at 4,300 rpm
Speed Limiter: 
Applications:
Honda Brio (2011–2014)
Honda City (Pakistan)
Honda Jazz (UK) (2008-2016)
Honda Civic (UK) (2008-2016)

L15A

L15A (i-VTEC / CNG)
This engine has been used since 2007 in Honda City CNG
SOHC 16 valve i-VTEC
Displacement: 
Bore x Stroke: 
Compression Ratio: 10.4:1
Power:  at 6,600 rpm
Torque:  at 4,800 rpm
CO2 emission: /km
Honda City CNG (Thailand)

L15A2 i-DSI
It debuted in Honda City/Fit Aria four door Sport-sedan in November 2002. 
Offered in the Fit Aria and Partner in Japan.
Displacement: 
Bore x Stroke: 
Compression Ratio: 10.8:1
Power:  at 5,500 rpm
Torque:  at 2,700 rpm

L15A1 VTEC

It debuted in JDM Fit and Mobilio Spike in September 2002.
Available in the Fit, Fit Aria, Airwave, Mobilio, and Mobilio Spike in Japan. Sold throughout the world with 5-speed manual or CVT options in the Fit/Jazz, Airwave and City. Canadian and US Fit models offered a 5-speed automatic instead of the CVT.
Displacement: 
Bore x Stroke: 
Compression Ratio: 10.4:1
Power:  at 5,800 rpm
Torque:  at 4,000 rpm

L15A7
This engine has been used since 2009 in 2nd Gen Honda Jazz

SOHC 16 valve i-VTEC
Displacement: 
Bore x Stroke: 
Compression Ratio: 10.4:1
Power:  at 6,600 rpm
Torque:  at 4,300 rpm (GE8 Fit)
CO2 emission: /km
Honda Fit (Japan series GE8 / 9)
Honda Jazz (Brazil, Thailand GE8 / 9)
Honda Freed (Japan series GB3 / 4)
Honda City (India, Brazil, Pakistan, Thailand, Malaysia, ASEAN)
Optional engine in any Sports Car Club of America Formula Ford 1600 chassis.  As of this time, the engine is only legal for Formula F racing in the United States in a series that uses the Ford Kent engine.  It is not legal in other markets using Formula F chassis where the Ford Kent engine is standard.
source https://web.archive.org/web/20101210012605/http://www.honda.co.jp/Fit/webcatalog/spec/ or http://www.honda.com.pk/city/specifications/Aspire.html

L15B & L15C

L15B (Earth Dreams + i-VTEC)

Applications

L15B & L15C (Earth Dreams VTC/VTEC Turbo)

Applications

Additional notes
Turbocharged L15B/L15C engines that feature VTC system have Variable Timing Control (VTC) on both the intake and exhaust side. It was advertised as VTEC Turbo in Australia and some Asian markets, despite not featuring an actual Variable Valve Lift system like conventional VTEC engines.
Turbocharged L15B/L15C engines in the Accord is similar to the engine in the CR-V, but with the addition of VTEC to the exhaust cam side
L15BG engine is flex fuel capable up to E85
L15BJ engine is a downtuned version of the L15BG engine.

L15Z

L15Z (i-VTEC)

Applications

Additional notes
L15Z1 (only FFV version) and L15Z2 engine is flex fuel capable up to E85

L15Z (Earth Dreams i-VTEC)

Applications

LD (L13-based Hybrid engine)

LDA (IMA)

Integrated Motor Assist (IMA) hybrid system, features Variable Cylinder Management (VCM)
Applications

Additional notes
LDA-MF3 and LDA1 engine feature i-DSI ignition system

LE (L15-based Hybrid engine)

LEA (IMA)

i-VTEC with Integrated Motor Assist (IMA) hybrid system
Applications

LEB (i-DCD)

Earth Dreams i-VTEC with Sport Hybrid i-DCD (intelligent Dual-Clutch Drive) system, operates in Atkinson-cycle
Applications

LEB & LEC (i-MMD)

Earth Dreams i-VTEC with Sport Hybrid “i-MMD” (Intelligent Multi Mode Drive) system, operates in Atkinson-cycle
Applications

References

External links
 Elaborate article about the Honda L-series engines
 The 2nd generation Honda L series engine in 2009 Fit
 2017 Honda Civic Si Press Release (L15B7)

L
Gasoline engines by model
Straight-four engines